Silence in the Forest is a 1929 German silent drama film directed by William Dieterle and starring Dieterle, Rina Marsa, and Petta Frederik. It was shot at the Babelsberg Studios in Berlin. The film's sets were designed by the art directors Otto Guelstorff and Gabriel Pellon. It was made by the German subsidiary of Universal Pictures and was the first of several film versions of the novel of the same title by Ludwig Ganghofer.

Cast

References

Bibliography

External links 
 

1929 films
Films of the Weimar Republic
German silent feature films
Films directed by William Dieterle
Films based on works by Ludwig Ganghofer
German black-and-white films
Films set in the Alps
Films set in forests
Universal Pictures films
1920s German films
1929 drama films
German drama films
Films shot at Babelsberg Studios